The following lists events that happened in 2013 in Iceland.

Incumbents
President – Ólafur Ragnar Grímsson 
Prime Minister – Jóhanna Sigurðardóttir (until 23 May), Sigmundur Davíð Gunnlaugsson (starting 23 May)

Events

January
 January 31 - Icelandic teenager Blaer Bjarkardottir wins a legal fight to use the name given to her by her mother, which the Icelandic Naming Committee had argued was not a proper female given name.

February
 February 27 - Gæðakokkar 30% meat pie on Iceland is found to not contain any meat at all.

April
 April 27 - Voters in Iceland go to the polls for a parliamentary election with a centre-right coalition expected to regain office.

May
 May 22 - Prime Minister elect of Iceland, Sigmundur Davíð Gunnlaugsson, declares that a January decision to freeze European Union membership talks will be extended indefinitely.

December
 December 2 - The Icelandic police kills a person for the first time since it became a republic in 1944.
 December 12 - Four former Icelandic bank bosses are jailed over concealing illegal activities within the bank Kaupthing.

References

 
2010s in Iceland
Iceland
Iceland
Years of the 21st century in Iceland